Jeroen Stekelenburg (1974) is a Dutch sport commentator. He has worked as a reporter for the NOS program Studio Sport.
since 2004

Family 
His father Jan Stekelenburg is editor of Studio Sport and his older brother Maarten Stekelenburg is a soccer coach.

References 

1974 births
Living people
Dutch sports journalists
Sportspeople from Amsterdam